KQDF-LD, virtual and UHF digital channel 25, is a low-power Visión Latina owned-and-operated television station licensed to Albuquerque, New Mexico, United States. The station is owned by HC2 Holdings and licensed to HC2 Station Group. KQDF-LD's transmitter is located atop Nine Mile Hill, west of Albuquerque.

History
This station signed on in mid-1999 as K35FC on UHF channel 35. It originally aired programming from a Spanish-language network called Gems Television. It would later carry mun2 a secondary network from Telemundo. In late 2001, this station had to cease broadcast on channel 35 to make way for the digital broadcast of KNME. It returned to the air in 2002 moving to channel 25 as KQDF-LP, airing programming from Azteca America.

The station was originally owned by Joseph W. Shaffer. In 2005, it was acquired by Una Vez Mas Holdings, LLC of Dallas, Texas. In early 2014, the broadcast assets of Una Vez Mas (UVM) were acquired by Northstar Media.

On October 9, 2015, KQDF-LP and three other low-powered television stations were sold to DTV America, a Florida-based company which operates many LPTV stations affiliated with a few different commercial networks. The sale was approved by the FCC on December 3, 2015. DTV America had also purchased K38IM, one of 32 low-powered stations the company acquired from Three Angels Broadcasting Network. This gave DTV America two stations in the Albuquerque market, however both were still in analog. In late April 2016, DTV America also acquired the licenses for three inactive digital TV stations in Santa Fe which all have construction permits. The stations are KAOE-LD channel 14, KFJK-LD channel 19 (license canceled on October 29, 2020), and KWPL-LD channel 45 purchased for $12,000 from Paul G. Donner. DTV America is a subsidiary of HC2 Holdings.

KQDF-LP was licensed for digital operation on December 21, 2020, and changed its call sign to KQDF-LD.

Digital channels

References

External links

Hispanic and Latino American culture in Albuquerque, New Mexico
Television channels and stations established in 1999
1999 establishments in New Mexico
Mass media in Albuquerque, New Mexico
QDF-LD
Innovate Corp.
Low-power television stations in the United States